Biopsychosocial models are a class of trans-disciplinary models which look at the interconnection between biology, psychology, and socio-environmental factors. These models specifically examine how these aspects play a role in topics ranging from human development, to health and disease, to information processing, and to conflict.

Gender can be thought of as biopsychosocial, as it is a complex process formed from social, psychological, and biological aspects.

The term was first used to describe a model advocated by George L. Engel in 1977. It now also refers to any model which takes a similar approach, and has become an alternative to the biomedical and/or psychological dominance of many health care systems.

History

George L. Engel and Jon Romano of the University of Rochester in 1977, are widely credited with being the first to propose a  biopsychosocial model. However, it had been proposed 100 years earlier and by others. Engel struggled with the then-prevailing biomedical approach to medicine as he strove for a more holistic approach by recognizing that each patient has their own thoughts, feelings, and history. In developing his model, Engel framed it for both illnesses and psychological problems.

Engel's biopsychosocial model reflects the development of illness through the complex interaction of biological factors (genetic, biochemical, etc.), psychological factors (mood, personality, behaviour, etc.) and social factors (cultural, familial, socioeconomic, medical, etc.). For example, a person may have a genetic predisposition for depression, but they must have social factors such as extreme stress at work and family life and psychological factors such as a perfectionistic tendencies which all trigger this genetic code for depression. A person may have a genetic predisposition for a disease, but social and cognitive factors must trigger the illness.

Specifically, Engel revolutionized medical thinking by re-proposing a separation of body and mind. The idea of mind–body dualism goes back at least to René Descartes, but was forgotten during the biomedical approach. Engel emphasized that the biomedical approach is flawed because the body alone does not contribute to illness. Instead, the individual mind (psychological and social factors) plays a significant role in how an illness is caused and how it is treated. Engel proposes a dialogue between the patient and the doctor in order to find the most effective treatment solution.

Similarly, materialistic and reductionist ideas proposed with the biomedical model are flawed because they cannot be verified on a cellular level (according to Engel). Instead, the proposed model focuses on the research of past psychologists such as Urie Bronfenbrenner, popularized by his belief that social factors play a role in developing illnesses and behaviors. Simply, Engel used Bronfenbrenner's research as a column of his biopsychosocial model and framed this model to display health at the center of social, psychological, and biological aspects.

After publication, the biopsychosocial model was adopted by the World Health Organization in 2002 as a basis for the International Classification of Function (ICF).

Engel's current model
Engel's biopsychosocial (BPS) model is still widely used as both a philosophy of clinical care and a practical clinical guide useful for broadening the scope of a clinician's gaze. Dr. Borrell-Carrió and colleagues reviewed Engel's model 25 years on. They proposed the model had evolved into a BPS and relationship-centered framework for physicians. They proposed three clarifications to the model, and identified seven established principles.

 Self-awareness.
 Active cultivation of trust.
 An emotional style characterized by empathic curiosity.
 Self-calibration as a way to reduce bias.
 Educating the emotions to assist with diagnosis and forming therapeutic relationships.
 Using informed intuition.
 Communicating clinical evidence to foster dialogue, not just the mechanical application of protocol.
Gatchel and colleagues argued in 2007 the biopsychosocial model is the most widely accepted as the most heuristic approach to understanding and treating chronic pain.

Relevant theories and theorists

Other theorists and researchers are using the term biopsychosocial, or sometimes bio-psycho-social to distinguish Engel's model.

Lumley and colleagues used a non-Engel model to conduct a biopsychosocial assessment of the relationship between and pain and emotion. Zucker and Gomberg used a non-Engel biopsychosocial perspective to assess the etiology of alcoholism in 1986.

Crittenden considers the Dynamic-Maturational Model of Attachment and Adaptation (DMM), to be a biopsychosocial model. It incorporates many disciplines to understand human development and information processing.

Kozlowska's Functional Somatic Symptoms model uses a biopsychosocial approach to understand somatic symptoms. Siegel's Interpersonal Neurobiology (IPNB) model is similar, although, perhaps to distinguish IPNB from Engel's model, he describes how the brain, mind, and relationships are part of one reality rather three separate elements. Most trauma -and violence-informed care models are biopsychosocial models.

Biopsychosocial research 
Wickrama and colleagues have conducted several biopsychosocial-based studies examining marital dynamics. In a longitudinal study of women divorced midlife they found that divorce contributed to an adverse biopsychosocial process for the women. In another study of enduring marriages, they looked to see if hostile marital interactions in the early middle years could wear down couples regulator systems through greater psychological distress, more health-risk behaviors, and a higher body mass index (BMI). Their findings confirmed negative outcomes and increased vulnerability to later physical health problems for both husbands and wives.

Kovacs and colleagues meta-study examined the biopsychosocial experiences of adults with congenital heart disease. Zhang and colleagues used a biopsychosocial approach to examine parents own physiological response  when facing children’s negative emotions, and how it related to parents’ ability to engage in sensitive and supportive behaviors. They found parents’ physiological regulatory functioning was an important factor in shaping parenting behaviors directed toward children’s emotions.

A biopsychosocial approach was used to assess race and ethnic differences in aging and to develop the Michigan Cognitive Aging Project. Banerjee and colleagues used a biopsychosocial narrative to describe the dual pandemic of suicide and COVID-19.

Potential applications

When Engel first proposed the biopsychosocial model it was for the purpose of better understanding health and illness. While this application still holds true the model is relevant to topics such as health, medicine, and development. Firstly, as proposed by Engel, it helps physicians better understand their whole patient. Considering not only physiological and medical aspects but also psychological and sociological well-being. Furthermore, this model is closely tied to health psychology. Health psychology examines the reciprocal influences of biology, psychology, behavioral, and social factors on health and illness.

One application of the biopsychosocial model within health and medicine relates to pain, such that several factors outside an individual's health may affect their perception of pain. For example, a 2019 study linked genetic and biopsychosocial factors to increased post-operative shoulder pain. Future studies are needed to model and further explore the relationship between biopsychosocial factors and pain.

The developmental applications of this model are equally relevant. One particular advantage of applying the biopsychosocial model to developmental psychology is that it allows for an intersection within the nature versus nurture debate. This model provides developmental psychologists a theoretical basis for the interplay of both hereditary and psychosocial factors on an individuals' development.

In Gender 
Gender is thought of by some as biopsychosocial. According to the Gender Spectrum Organization, "A person’s gender is the complex interrelationship between three dimensions: body, identity, and social gender."

According to Alex Iantaffi and Meg-John Barker, biological, psychological, and social factors all feed back into each other in complex ways to form a person's gender.

Criticisms
There have been a number of criticisms of Engel's biopsychosocial model. Benning summarized the arguments against the model including that it lacked philosophical coherence, was insensitive to patients' subjective experience, was unfaithful to the general systems theory that Engel claimed it be rooted in, and that it engendered an undisciplined eclecticism that provides no safeguards against either the dominance or the under-representation of any one of the three domains of bio, psycho, or social.

Psychiatrist Hamid Tavakoli argues that Engel's BPS model should be avoided because it unintentionally promotes an artificial distinction between biology and psychology, and merely causes confusion in psychiatric assessments and training programs, and that ultimately it has not helped the cause of trying to de-stigmatize mental health.  The perspectives model does not make that arbitrary distinction.

A number of these criticisms have been addressed over recent years. For example, the BPS-Pathways model describes how it is possible to conceptually separate, define, and measure biological, psychological, and social factors, and thereby seek detailed interrelationships among these factors.

While Engel's call to arms for a biopsychosocial model has been taken up in several healthcare fields and developed in related models, it has not been adopted in acute medical and surgical domains, as of 2017.

References 

Interdisciplinary branches of psychology